The Classical Shipwreck at Alonnisos (Greek Αλóννησος) is a shipwreck of the Classical Greek period that sunk near the islet Peristera at a depth of 30 m. Its cargo of 3000-4000 amphoras made it the largest transport ship yet known of its period when excavation began in 1992, and it carried wine from Mende and Skopelos. In addition to amphoras, the ship transported many valuable items including black-glazed cups, plates and bronze tableware. 

The region around the shipwreck is currently under development as an underwater museum.

Discovery 
In 1985 a Greek fisherman discovered a large Classical shipwreck at Alonnisos in the Northern Sporades near the islet of Peristera and declared it to the Greek Department of Maritime Antiquities. Department personnel conducted a survey in 1991 under the Director of the department Elpida Hadjidaki. The wreck was marked by thousands of amphorae forming a mound 25 m by 12 m and clearly indicating the shape of the ship. The upper layer was jumbled, but the lower layer appeared relatively undisturbed. The size of the mound indicated that this shipwreck was twice as large as any other shipwreck of the Classical period discovered at that time.

Three of the amphorae were recovered for examination. They dated to the last quarter of the 5th c BC, and were identified as wine amphorae from Mende and Skopelos.

Excavation 
Systematic excavation of the shipwreck began in 1992, again led by the director of the Greek Department of Maritime Antiquities.  The first task was a survey of the existing state of the wreck, and this was done by preparing a photomosaic from photographs taken at a height of 7 m above the wreck. Next, the wreck was covered by a rope grid  m in extent that divided the region under investigation into   m sections.

Excavation began in one of the  m sections near the western end of the mound. Nineteen amphoras were recovered from the top layer in this section, and another nineteen from a second layer beneath the first.  

Underneath was a third layer with an additional 27 amphoras, and beneath them 35 additional artifacts including black-glazed bowls, cups, plates, and elegant bronze tableware. 

The bulk of the amphoras come from Mende and Skopelos, ancient Peparethos, and a smaller number originated at Ikos, Chios, and Kerkyra. All artifacts, including amphoras, cups, and bowls, date to the late fifth century BC.

Excavation resumed in the summer of 1993, in a second   section adjacent to the first. This contained 68 amphoras in four layers, under which were additional artifacts, ballast stones, and chunks of wood. In 1999 in a third   section was excavated, and an additional 80 amphoras were obtained, as well as objects belonging to the crew such as oil lamps, table amphoras, and mortars.

In 2000, three additional   sections were excavated. Hundreds of additional amphoras were found, but they were not all brought to the surface. Of greater interest were 82 pieces of wood found at the lowest excavation layers. Although none of them were more than a few centimeters in extent, they provided the first evidence for the ship construction. Fourteen of the pieces were Treenails, around 7 cm in diameter, within which were large copper nails.

Fragments of wooden planks from the ship's hull showed them to be 8 cm in thickness.

Significance 
A conservative estimate of the cargo of the Alonnisos shipwreck indicates that it carried 4200 amphoras, with a weight of 126 metric tons. The length of the hull was 25 to 30 m. This makes it considerably larger than the shipwrecks from other Classical shipwrecks such as Kyrenia, Porticello, or Ma'agan Michael. Thus we have a conclusive proof that the Greeks constructed ships capable of carrying burdens up to 150 metric tons from the fifth century BC onwards.

Underwater Museum 
The marine area surrounding the Alonnisos shipwreck is protected as part of the Alonnisos Marine Park. The area immediately surrounding the shipwreck is under development as an underwater museum. However, research excavation has not yet been completed.

References 

Marine reserves
Protected areas established in 1992
Shipwrecks of Greece